The Alemannic Wikipedia (Alemannic: Alemannischi Wikipedia) is the Alemannic language edition of the Web-based free-content encyclopedia Wikipedia. The project was started on November 13, 2003, as an Alsatian language edition. A year later it was expanded to encompass all Alemannic dialects because of low activity in the first year. Since 2004 all Alemannic dialects are accepted on als:wp.

Contributors and users include people from Germany, Switzerland, Austria, France, Liechtenstein, and even a few Walser people from Italy.

Language

Articles and article titles
A peculiarity of the Alemannic Wikipedia is the wide range of dialects permitted; all varieties of Alemannic, including Swiss German, Swabian, Alsatian, and all others are accepted. Authors may not normally alter the dialect used by another contributor, though exceptions are made for local topics, in which modifying the text to reflect the local variety is encouraged. Articles may thus be written in a mix of different varieties. Since there is no standardized orthography for Alemannic, spelling rules are quite relaxed. However, contributors are encouraged to adhere to spelling conventions found in the Alemannic-language literature, and introducing new symbols is not tolerated.

Article titles are in Standard German, but display is frequently manipulated to show Alemannic text.

Language codes
The code "als" was used because in 2003 there had been no language code for Alsatian. ISO 639-3 gives four codes for several Alemannic dialects:
 gct is the code for Alemán Coloniero
 gsw is the code for Swiss German, also for Alsatian
 swg is the code for Swabian German
 wae is the code for Walser German
As all of these four dialects are accepted on the Alemannic Wikipedia, it was decided not to move the Alemannic Wikipedia to gsw.wikipedia.org, even though the code als stands for Tosk Albanian in ISO 639-3. To solve this problem a request for a superior code for all Alemannic dialects has been submitted to SIL International by Alemannic Wikipedians.

Despite the existence of dedicated ISO 639-3 codes and the possibility of more specific marking with country code subtags, all pages use 'gsw' in the HTML language tag.

List of dialects that are used on single-dialect pages
Below is a list of dialects that have a category in :als:Kategorie:Wikipedia:Dialekt and where that category contains at least one article.

Other Wikipedias in German dialect
Alemannic Wikipedia was the first Wikipedia in a German dialect, followed by the Bavarian Wikipedia and the Ripuarian Wikipedia.

Alemannic in other Wikimedia projects
Other Wikimedia projects in Alemannic have also been created, such as an Alemannic Wiktionary, an Alemannic Wikiquote, and an Alemannic Wikibooks. As activity in these projects was low even after years, the community of the Alemannic Wikipedia decided to merge all Alemannic projects and import all contents of the other projects into the Alemannic Wikipedia. Since April 2008 these projects are separate namespaces within the Alemannic Wikipedia. Also an Alemannic Wikisource and an Alemannic Wikinews have been created as separate namespaces within als:wp.

Wikidata supports one language with code 'gsw' and name 'Swiss German'. A proposal to remove it has not been adopted.

Milestones

See also
 Alemannic Wikibooks
 Alemannic Wikinews
 Alemannic Wikiquote
 Alemannic Wikisource
 Alemannic Wikivoyage
 Alemannic Wiktionary

References

Sources and external links

 (Alemannic) Alemannic Wikipedia
 (Alemannic) Alemannic Wikipedia mobile version (not fully supported)
 Statistics for Alemannic Wikipedia by Erik Zachte
 https://meta.wikimedia.org/wiki/Alemannic_Wikipedia
 
 
 
 
 
 
 



Wikipedias by language
Wikipedia
Internet properties established in 2003
German-language encyclopedias
Wikipedias in Germanic languages